Unai Alba Pagadizabal (born 19 February 1978 in Oiartzun, Gipuzkoa, Basque Country) is a Spanish former professional footballer who played as a goalkeeper.

External links

1978 births
Living people
People from Oiartzun
Spanish footballers
Footballers from the Basque Country (autonomous community)
Association football goalkeepers
La Liga players
Segunda División players
Segunda División B players
Tercera División players
Real Unión footballers
Barakaldo CF footballers
Athletic Bilbao footballers
Hércules CF players
Orihuela CF players
CD Alcoyano footballers
Ontinyent CF players
Basque Country international footballers